Jon Jae-son (born 1940) is an army general and politician of the Democratic People's Republic of Korea. He is Vice Marshal of the Korean People's Army.

Biography
Born in 1940 during the Japanese colonial rule, he graduated from Kim Il Sung Military University. In August 1981, he served as Deputy Chief of General Staff Department of the Korean People's Army, and was promoted to the commander V Corps in 1985.

In February 1986, at the 11th plenum meeting of the 6th Central Committee of the Workers' Party of Korea, he was elected as a candidate member for the Central Committee of the Party. In April 1992, he was promoted to Captain of the People's Army, and in February 1994, he served as the General of the People's Army. In 1997 he was promoted to the rank of Vice Marshal. In September 2010, he was dismissed as a party commissioner.

References

North Korean generals
Kim Il-sung University alumni
Workers' Party of Korea politicians